K. L. Chishi born on 1st January 1944, is an Indian politician from Indian National Congress. He was the founder chief of the Nationalist Democratic Movement, a political party in the Indian state of Nagaland. He served as Chief Minister of Nagaland in 1990 for 28 days after which he resigned from office. He successfully contested state elections (2008) from Dimapur-I constituency (Dimapur) under Indian National Congress party. He left Indian National Congress to join Bharatiya Janata Party in January 2018. He rejoined Indian National Congress on 14 March 2019.

References 

Year of death missing
Indian National Congress politicians from Nagaland
Chief Ministers of Nagaland
Chief ministers from Indian National Congress
1944 births